Lusail University is a private university in Lusail, Qatar. It is the first national private university in Qatar.

History
Lusail University was officially inaugurated on April 29, 2020. Former Attorney General of Qatar Ali Bin Fetais Al-Marri is the chairman of the university's board of trustees.

In October 2020, Lusail University signed an MoU (memorandum of understanding) with Qatar University to collaborate on academic, scientific, and organizational projects going forward. In November 2020, Lusail University held an event featuring a talk by Tunisian President Kais Saied. In December 2020, Lusail University signed an agreement with Qatar Charity (QC) to collaborate on research, education, and training for fulfilling humanitarian needs.

In 2021, the Turkish government sent a delegation of Turkish students to Lusail University on scholarships to learn how to communicate in Arabic and to bolster relations between Qatar and Turkey. In June 2021, the Qatar Fund for Development (QFFD) also signed an agreement to cover tuition costs for a select number of international students attending Lusail University as undergraduate students.

Academics
Lusail University is made up of four colleges: the College of Commerce and Business, the College of Education and Arts, the College of Law, and the College of Information Technology. The College of Commerce and Business offers seven Bachelor of Business Administration in Innovation and Entrepreneurship, Insurance and Risk Management, Supply Chain Management, Human Resources Management, Marketing, and Management. The College of Education and Arts offers two Bachelor of Education in English Language Teaching and in Counseling and Mental Health, as well as a Bachelor of Arts in Political Science. The College of Law offers two Bachelor of Law, one of them from Paris 1 Panthéon-Sorbonne University. Lastly, the College of Information Technology offers three Bachelor of Science in Information Technology in Cybersecurity, Artificial Intelligence, and Digital Game Design and Development. Majors are offered in three languages: Arabic, English, and French.  

The university used to offer programs such as Business Administration and Marketing and Distribution Techniques, French Studies, and Public Law and Private Law. Certain programs and courses were offered in cooperation with the University of Hassan II Casablanca Morocco, the University of Jordan, and Sussex University in the United Kingdom. 

Lusail University is accredited by the Qatar Ministry of Higher Education.

Admissions
Lusail University's admissions policy requires students to score 65% or higher in high school or its equivalent and to pass English language tests for admission to its English programs. If a student has a GPA lower than 65% but no less than 50%, they can also take a placement test for admission to the university.

Lusail University also offers grants to high school students who have excelled in secondary school academics or sports, students who have excelled in business, and students with special needs.

References

External links

Universities in Qatar
Lusail
Educational institutions established in 2020
2020 establishments in Qatar
Private universities and colleges